The Mandé Variations is a 2008 studio album by Toumani Diabaté, produced by Nick Gold for World Circuit. Unlike many of his recordings which feature large ensembles, it consists of solo Kora throughout. The influences range from traditional Kora pieces to modern Western music.

The album was released in the United Kingdom on 25 February 2008 by World Circuit, and in the United States on 26 February 2008 by Nonesuch Records.

Track listing
"Si naani" – 10:31
"Elyne Road" – 8:50
"Ali Farka Toure" – 6:20 
"Kaounding Cissoko" – 6:27
"Ismael Drame" – 5:45
"Djourou Kara Nany" – 6:53
"El Nabiyouna" – 6:03
"Cantelowes" – 6:57

Personnel
Toumani Diabaté, kora

References

External links
The Mandé Variations at Nonesuch Records

2008 albums
World Circuit (record label) albums
Nonesuch Records albums